The Mayor of Youngstown is the chief executive of the government of the city of Youngstown, Ohio. The term of office for the mayor and members of Youngstown City Council is four years. Youngstown, Ohio has had a total of 50 recorded mayoral administrations, including the city's current mayor.  Youngstown has traditionally been led by Democratic mayors.

According to the Youngstown Home Rule Charter, the City of Youngstown’s executive branch is led by the mayor, who is elected on a nonpartisan ballot to a four-year term. The mayor must be a qualified elector, at least 30 years old and a city resident for five years immediately preceding the election. The mayor may hold no other public office except that of a notary public. The mayor may serve two complete, consecutive four-year terms and is eligible for re-election after an intervening term. As the chief executive officer of the city, the mayor’s duties include: 

 Supervising City government administration 
 Keeping the peace 
 Ensuring city ordinances are enforced 
 Recommending legislation to City Council 
 Advising Council on the financial condition and needs of the community 
 Preparing and submitting to Council any reports it requires 
 Appointing and removing directors of all city departments, as well as members of city boards and commissions 
 Representing the city’s interest with officials in Columbus and Washington, DC 

The mayor and department heads are entitled to seats in Council but do not have voting privileges. The mayor has the right to introduce ordinances and take part in the discussion of all matters coming before Council. 

When the mayor is absent from the city, or is unable for any reason to perform his duties, the President of City Council is the acting mayor. The Youngstown Home Rule Charter requires that the Mayor’s Administrative Council, which consists of the mayor and the heads of departments/divisions, meet at least once each month to discuss matters relating to the administration of city affairs and the improvement of methods and procedures in various departments. 

The mayor’s day-to-day activities focus on overseeing and coordinating the work of the city’s six administrative departments: Law, Finance, Public Works, Water & other public utilities, Police and Fire, as well as the Park and Recreation Commission and the City District Board of Health.

19th century

20th century

21st century

References

 Aley, Howard C. (1975). A Heritage to Share: The Bicentennial History of Youngstown and the Mahoning Valley. Youngstown, OH: The Bicentennial Commission of Youngstown and Mahoning County, Ohio, p. 558.

See also
List of people from Youngstown, Ohio
List of Ohio politicians

  
Youngstown